Feliks Józef Ankerstein (1897 – ? 1955) was a Polish Army major and intelligence officer.

Career
Ankerstein served during World War I in the Polish Legions and the Polish Military Organization, and after the war in the Polish Army. He participated in the Silesian Uprisings.

He became an officer in the Second Department of Polish General Staff (the intelligence section), serving as deputy to the chief of its Office 2, Edmund Charaszkiewicz (1929–39), and as a member of the secret K-7 organization (Komitet Siedmiu, "Committee of Seven") that supervised certain covert operations.

He was engaged in covert operations from 16 September 1928, including the 1938 annexation of Zaolzie and operations conducted in autumn 1938 in collaboration with Hungary in Carpathian Rus.

After the invasion of Poland in September 1939, Ankerstein worked in Section II's Office (Ekspozytura) "R" in Romania. He later made his way to London, where he reportedly about 1940 entered the service of British intelligence.

After the war, he remained abroad.

See also
Edmund Charaszkiewicz
List of Poles
List of guerrillas

Notes

References
Edmund Charaszkiewicz, Zbiór dokumentów ppłk. Edmunda Charaszkiewicza (A Collection of Documents by Lt. Col. Edmund Charaszkiewicz), opracowanie, wstęp i przypisy (edited, with introduction and notes by) Andrzej Grzywacz, Marcin Kwiecień, Grzegorz Mazur, Kraków, Księgarnia Akademicka, 2000, .
Edmund Charaszkiewicz, "Referat o działaniach dywersyjnych w Czechosłowacji" ("Report on Covert Operations in Czechoslovakia"), in Zbiór dokumentów ppłk. Edmunda Charaszkiewicza (A Collection of Documents by Lt. Col. Edmund Charaszkiewicz), pp. 88–105.
Edmund Charaszkiewicz, "Referat o działaniach dywersyjnych na Rusi Karpackiej" ("Report on Covert Operations in Carpathian Rus"), in Zbiór dokumentów ppłk. Edmunda Charaszkiewicza (A Collection of Documents by Lt. Col. Edmund Charaszkiewicz), pp. 106–30.
Józef Kasparek, "Poland's 1938 Covert Operations in Ruthenia," East European Quarterly, vol. XXIII, no. 3 (September 1989), pp. 365–73.
Józef Kasparek, Przepust karpacki: tajna akcja polskiego wywiadu (The Carpathian Bridge: a Secret Polish Intelligence Operation), Warsaw, Sigma NOT, 1992, .
Paweł Samuś, Kazimierz Badziak, Giennadij Matwiejew, Akcja "Łom":  polskie działania dywersyjne na Rusi Zakarpackiej w świetle dokumentów Oddziału II Sztabu Głównego WP (Operation Crowbar:  Polish Covert Operations in Transcarpathian Rus in Light of Documents of Section II of the Polish General Staff), Warsaw, Adiutor, 1998.

1897 births
1955 deaths
Polish intelligence officers
Austro-Hungarian military personnel of World War I
Polish military personnel of World War II
Place of birth missing